Paduka Sri Sultan Ataullah Muhammad Shah I ibni al-Marhum Sultan Sulaiman Shah I (died 22 January 1473) was the eighth Sultan of Kedah. His reign was from 1423 to 1473.

External links
 List of Sultans of Kedah

1473 deaths
15th-century Sultans of Kedah